La Ferté-Imbault is a commune in the Loir-et-Cher department of central France.

Geography
The Rère forms part of the commune's southern border.

Population

Veteran cycles rally
The annual rally of the International Veteran Cycle Association was held in La Ferté-Imbault from 1 to 5 June 2011.

See also
Communes of the Loir-et-Cher department

References

Communes of Loir-et-Cher